The men's 50 metre freestyle S2 event at the 2012 Paralympic Games took place on 7 September, at the London Aquatics Centre.

Two heats were held, both with six swimmers. The swimmers with the eight fastest times advanced to the final.

Heats

Heat 1

Heat 2

Final

References

Swimming at the 2012 Summer Paralympics